The Clare Militia was a British militia regiment from 1798 to 1909.  It was based in County Clare (now in the Republic of Ireland). At first an infantry unit, it was converted to artillery in 1882, making it the last artillery militia unit raised in the British forces. It was disbanded in 1909.

Clare Militia
The Clare Militia was raised as an infantry regiment at Clarecastle, Ennis, in 1793. Its headquarters remained at Ennis throughout its existence.  

The United Kingdom Militia was revived by the Militia Act of 1852, enacted during a period of international tension. As before, units were raised and administered on a county basis, and filled by voluntary enlistment (although conscription by means of the Militia Ballot might be used if the counties failed to meet their quotas). Training was for 56 days on enlistment, then for 21–28 days per year, during which the men received full army pay. Under the Act, Militia units could be embodied by Royal Proclamation for full-time home defence service in three circumstances:
 1. 'Whenever a state of war exists between Her Majesty and any foreign power'.
 2. 'In all cases of invasion or upon imminent danger thereof'.
 3. 'In all cases of rebellion or insurrection'.

Following the Cardwell Reforms a mobilisation scheme began to appear in the Army List from December 1875. This assigned Regular and Militia units to places in an order of battle of corps, divisions and brigades for the 'Active Army', even though these formations were entirely theoretical, with no staff or services assigned. The Clare Militia were assigned to 2nd Brigade of 1st Division, VI Army Corps. The brigade would have mustered at Conway in North Wales in time of war.

Under the Childers Reforms, which came into effect on 1 July 1881, the battalion was scheduled to become 3rd Bn Royal Munster Fusiliers; in March 1882 it began to amalgamate with the South Cork Militia to form this battalion, However, a month later the Clare Militia was instead converted to artillery as 7th Brigade, South Irish Division, Royal Artillery on 1 April 1882. This was the last Militia Artillery unit ever formed by the British Home forces.

Clare Artillery
On 1 July 1889 the South Irish Division of the Royal Artillery was abolished and the unit became the Clare Artillery (Southern Division RA).

Between 19 February and 16 November 1900 the unit was embodied for the Second Boer War. In 1902 it was renamed The Clare Artillery, Royal Garrison Artillery (Militia).

After the Boer War, the future of the Militia was called into question. There were moves to reform all the Auxiliary Forces (Militia, Yeomanry and Volunteers) to take their place in the six Army corps proposed by St John Brodrick as Secretary of State for War. For this, some batteries of Militia Artillery were to be converted to field artillery. However, little of Brodrick's scheme was carried out.

Under the more sweeping Haldane Reforms of 1908, the Militia was replaced by the Special Reserve, a semi-professional force whose role was to provide reinforcement drafts for Regular units serving overseas in wartime. Although the Clare RGA (M) transferred to the Special Reserve Royal Field Artillery on 31 May 1908 (taking the title Clare Royal Field Reserve Artillery), it was disbanded in 1909.

Notes

References

 Col John K. Dunlop, The Development of the British Army 1899–1914, London: Methuen, 1938.
 J.B.M. Frederick, Lineage Book of British Land Forces 1660–1978, Vol II, Wakefield: Microform Academic, 1984, .
 Lt-Col James Moncrieff Grierson (Col Peter S. Walton, ed.), Scarlet into Khaki: The British Army on the Eve of the Boer War, London: Sampson Low, 1899/London: Greenhill, 1988, .

 Norman E.H. Litchfield, The Militia Artillery 1852–1909 (Their Lineage, Uniforms and Badges), Nottingham: Sherwood Press, 1987, .
 Edward M. Spiers, The Army and Society 1815–1914, London: Longmans, 1980, .

Irish Militia regiments
Defunct Irish regiments of the British Army
Military units and formations established in 1793
Clare
1909 disestablishments in Ireland
Military units and formations disestablished in 1909
1793 establishments in Ireland